Micropterix wockei is a species of moth belonging to the family Micropterigidae. It was described by Otto Staudinger in 1871. It is named after Maximilian Ferdinand Wocke. It is known from Greece.

The length of the forewings is 3.4 mm for males and 4.2 mm for females.

References

Micropterigidae
Moths described in 1871
Moths of Europe
Taxa named by Otto Staudinger